Elaine Murphy, Baroness Murphy (born 16 January 1947) is a British independent politician and a member of the House of Lords.

Biography
After qualifying as a doctor and then as a psychiatrist she later became an academic in the National Health Service for 25 years. She spent a period as a Health Service general manager between 1984 and 1990 which included the post of District General Manager for Lewisham and North Southwark Health Authority. She was the first Professor of Psychiatry of Old Age in the UK, held at the University of London at Guy's Hospital. She took on non-executive roles after retirement and was Chair of North East London Strategic Health Authority until 30 June 2006. She was a Visiting Professor at Queen Mary University of London, Vice-President of the Alzheimer's Society and Chair of Council at St George's, University of London between 2009 and 2012, and was a non-executive member of Monitor (Independent Monitor of NHS Hospitals).

On 17 June 2004, she was made a life peer as Baroness Murphy, of Aldgate in the City of London, taking an interest in mental health and ageing issues in the House of Lords where she sits as a Crossbencher.

She was first married 1969–2000 to John Murphy, the branding 'guru' and brewer and then second, from 2001, to Professor Michael A Robb FRS, a theoretical chemist. She lives in Norfolk and has homes in London and Lucca, where she grows olives.

In January 2009, it was revealed that she was the author of a hoax letter about "cello scrotum" that was printed in the British Medical Journal in 1974.

Baroness Murphy also has a PhD in Social History and has published in the field of 18th and 19th century workhouses, madhouses and local history. Her publications include The Moated Grange: A History of South Norfolk Through the Story of one Home, 1300-2000 (2015), about the village of Brockdish in South Norfolk. She is an honorary associate of the National Secular Society.

References

External links
Bio at SGUL
Bio at City University

People's peers 
Life peeresses created by Elizabeth II
1947 births
Living people
Alumni of the University of Manchester
Crossbench life peers
People from Chilwell